Vasco Fernandes Coutinho (14th-century) was a Portuguese nobleman, who served as vassal of Ferdinand I. He was Lord of Couto de Leomil (pt).

Biography 

Vasco Fernandes was the son of Fernaö Mártins da Fonseca Coutinho and Theresa Pires Varella, belonging to noble Lusitanian lineages.  His wife was Beatriz Gonçalves de Moura, a noble woman, daughter of Gonçalo Vasques de Moura (Alcalde of Moura), and Inês Gonçalves de Sequeira.

References 

14th-century Portuguese people
Portuguese nobility
Portuguese Roman Catholics